Hebanthe is a genus of flowering plant in the family Amaranthaceae, native to Mexico to southern tropical America. The genus was first described by Carl von Martius.

Species
, Plants of the World Online accepted the following species:
Hebanthe erianthos (Poir.) Pedersen
Hebanthe grandiflora (Hook.) Borsch & Pedersen
Hebanthe occidentalis (R.E.Fr.) Borsch & Pedersen
Hebanthe pulverulenta Mart.
Hebanthe reticulata (Seub.) Borsch & Pedersen
Hebanthe spicata Mart.

References

Amaranthaceae
Amaranthaceae genera